The Money-printing Public Corporation of the Republic of Indonesia (shortened as Peruri) is the Indonesian state-owned banknote/security printers and mint, established on 15 September 1971 through the merger of state mint Artha Yasa and state printers Pertjetakan Kebajoran (a.k.a. Perkeba).

Printers Pertjetakan Kebajoran had originally been established with assistance from Dutch banknote printers Joh. Enschedé.

It has offices in Jakarta, Karawang and Surabaya, with marketing and administrative functions taking place in Jakarta, and printing and minting occurring in Karawang and Surabaya.

Since 2007, Perum Peruri has also been printing Nepalese Rupees.

References

External links
 Official site

Banknote printing companies
1971 establishments in Indonesia
United States
Manufacturing companies established in 1971
Publishing companies established in 1971
Government-owned companies of Indonesia
Manufacturing companies based in Jakarta